Bouquets to Art is an annual floral exhibition hosted by the De Young Museum of the Fine Arts Museums of San Francisco. Florists, designers and garden clubs are invited to present floral interpretations of works in the museums' permanent collections, and the floral displays are presented in juxtaposition with the works that inspired them.

Now in its landmark 30th year, Bouquets to Art 2014 at the de Young will showcase work by 125 of the Bay Area's most talented and renowned floral designers. This select group of artists will display original creations ranging in style from the classical to the avant-garde. They will draw inspiration from pieces in the de Young's permanent collections, highlighting the diverse array of works in the museum's holdings in American art to the 20th century, international contemporary art, art of the ancient Americas and Native American art.

In addition to pairing floral designs with the museum's artworks, the annual exhibition features an extensive program of floral design demonstrations and activities for all ages. In honor of its 30th anniversary, Bouquets to Art 2014 will be on display for an extended run of seven days, allowing visitors to enjoy and revisit their favorite displays. Colin B. Bailey, director of the Fine Arts Museums of San Francisco acknowledges “that, since its inception the event has become a cherished San Francisco tradition for both art and flower devotees and draws an avid following from throughout the San Francisco Bay Area.” This year, Bouquets to Art 2014 coincides with the special exhibition Modern Nature: Georgia O'Keeffe and Lake George, celebrating the artist famed for her striking depictions of flowers and scenes of nature.

Bouquets to Art 2014 begins on the evening of Monday, March 17, with an opening-night gala and preview of all the floral designs, including a magnificent flower chandelier by Natasha Lisitsa of Waterlily Pond Studio as the centerpiece of the de Young's Wilsey Court. The festive evening will include an elegant buffet catered by McCalls and will feature music by Switched ON Audio, the Jesse Barrett Quartet, and Alan K. Choy. The gala will also host a one-time showing of Floral Fashions, a showcase of couture interpretations of artworks in the de Young's collections, created and modeled by students from the Environmental Horticulture/Floristry department, City College of San Francisco.

The Bouquets to Art week will feature demonstrations by locally and nationally acclaimed floral designers, among them a Bouquets to Art founding designer, the chief floral designer for the White House, and the artistic director of the flowers for the 2011 royal wedding of the Duke and Duchess of Cambridge. There will be seated luncheons by McCalls hosted on Tuesday, Wednesday and Thursday, and for the first time this year, there will be special hands-on art activities for children during the weekend. Bouquets to Art 2014 concludes on Sunday, March 23, with a raffle drawing of prizes that include exotic travel packages, fine dining, wine tastings and other luxury items. All proceeds from the entire Bouquet to Art event benefit the Fine Arts Museums of San Francisco.

Presented by the volunteer members of the San Francisco Auxiliary of the Fine Arts Museums, this popular and highly attended event is expected to reach record attendance numbers for its 30th celebration. Funds from previous presentations of Bouquets to Art have been used to support an extensive roster of special exhibitions, art acquisitions, educational programs, and special projects at the Legion of Honor and the de Young. Income from Bouquets to Art 2013 was used to fund, in part, the special exhibitions Impressionists on the Water, which was on view at the Legion of Honor from June to October 2013, and Modern Nature: Georgia O'Keeffe and Lake George, on view at the de Young from February 15 through May 11, 2014.

The Fine Arts Museums of San Francisco consist of the Legion of Honor and the de Young Museum. For several years, while the de Young Museum was closed for construction, the exhibition was presented at the Legion. In 2006, with the reopening of the de Young, Bouquets to Art returned there.

References

External links
Official sites
 http://deyoung.famsf.org/deyoung/exhibitions/bouquets-to-art

Photogalleries
Bouquets to Art 2010 Flickr Group Photos
Bouquets to Art 2009 Flickr Group Photos
Thomas Christensen: Bouquets to Art, 2006
Margaret Lew's gallery Bouquets to Art, 2007

Art exhibitions in the United States
Culture of San Francisco